Rossmoor can refer to several places in the United States:

 Rossmoor, California, in Orange County
 Rossmoor, Walnut Creek, California, a gated community in Contra Costa County
 Rossmoor, Maryland
 Rossmoor, New Jersey